Sulayman Solong (c. 1550 – c. 1637) was the first historical sultan of Darfur. According to several sources, he ruled the Sultanate of Darfur from 1596 to 1637. However, because of the lack of contemporary references, estimates of his reign dates diverge widely, with some modern scholars stating that he probably reigned between 1660 and 1680.

Biography
The region of Darfur is named after the Fur people inhabiting it. The Fur succeeded the Tunjur as the dominant people in the region. The royal Keira (also spelled Kayra) clan sprang from the Kunjara, one of the three Fur tribes. Although Fur tradition speaks of early rulers such as Daali and Kuuruu, they are generally regarded as folk heroes. Sulaiman Solong is considered the first historical ruler of the Keira dynasty. According to traditional accounts, a land dispute erupted between Sulaiman's father Kuuruu and his uncle Tunsam, which forced Kuuruu to flee with Sulaiman to Dar Masalit in the west. Sulaiman grew up there among his mother's Masalit tribe, to whom an Arab origin is generally ascribed. When he became strong enough, he overthrew his uncle Tunsam, recaptured Jabal Marra from him and forced him to flee east to the border with Kordofan. Modern historians hypothesize that the civil war between Kuuruu and Tunsam may be linked to the collapse of the Tunjur empire.

Little is known of Sulaiman's reign beyond vague generalities. The traditions surrounding him were recorded two centuries later. Sulaiman's nickname "Solong" means "the red-faced" or "the Arab" in the Fur language, in reference either to his complexion or to his mother's origins. He is remembered as a warrior and conqueror who led 33 military campaigns, thereby transforming his Fur tribal kingdom into a multiethnic empire in succession to the Tunjur. He conquered Kordofan and for a time extended his dominions over Sennar, which was weakened due to a series of civil wars. His conquests were mainly aimed at increasing the number of slaves he held, which he could then barter with merchants from surrounding regions for arms, war-horses and fine cloth. Nevertheless, Sulaiman's sultanate lagged behind other Sub-Saharan African states in terms of modern weaponry. Unlike the Bornu or Songhai empires, Darfur did not use firearms.

The monarchy Sulaiman founded followed the then common African model of divine kingship, which was later transformed under the impact of Islam. Sulaiman is traditionally credited with making Islam the sultanate's state religion. The prior religion of his semi-legendary predecessors is unclear, with some sources suggesting that it was paganism. Sulaiman built mosques for his subjects and encouraged Islamic practices such as circumcision. However, the Islamization of the Keira state was a slow process, and the monarchy retained pre-Islamic rituals throughout its existence.

Sulaiman was married to an Arab woman. He was succeeded on his death by his son Musa Sulayman and was buried on Jabal Marra, which went on to become the ancestral cemetery of the Fur sultans. Sulaiman was considered the "founding father" of the Keira state, a status that was highlighted in the oral traditions as well as on the seals of succeeding sultans, which often gave a pedigree back to Sulaiman. Nevertheless, historian Peter Malcolm Holt writes in the Encyclopaedia of Islam that Sulaiman was probably not the founder of the Keira dynasty, but simply its first Muslim ruler. Sulaiman's descendants continued to reign over Darfur until Ali Dinar's death in battle at the hands of the British in 1916.

See also
History of Darfur
Islamization of Sudan

References

Bibliography

External links

1550s births
1637 deaths
16th-century monarchs in Africa
17th-century monarchs in Africa
Founding monarchs
Keira dynasty
Muslim monarchs
Sultans of Darfur